George Martinez (born August 5, 1961) is an American football coach and former player. He served as the head football coach at Oklahoma Panhandle State University in 1988 and at Northwestern Oklahoma State University from 1989 to 1991, compiling a career college football coaching record of 11–28. He currently serves as a football coach at Agua Fria High School in Avondale, Arizona.

References

1961 births
Living people
Arizona Cardinals coaches
East Central Tigers football coaches
Oakland Raiders coaches
Oklahoma Panhandle State Aggies football coaches
New Mexico Highlands Cowboys football coaches
Northwestern Oklahoma State Rangers football players
High school football coaches in Arizona
People from Fort Bragg, North Carolina
Players of American football from North Carolina